The  Washington Redskins season was the franchise's 79th season in the National Football League (NFL), and their first under new head coach Mike Shanahan, who also began his term as the team's Vice President of Football Operations. The Redskins obtained the 4th pick in the 2010 NFL Draft as a result of their 4–12 record from their previous season, which they used to draft Oklahoma tackle Trent Williams. Finishing the season 6–10, the Redskins improved on their 4–12 record from the 2009 season, but were officially eliminated from postseason contention in Week 14. Of the 16 games of the season, only four (all losses) were decided by more than a single possession.

With new starting quarterback Donovan McNabb, who replaced Jason Campbell (traded to Oakland), Washington aimed to improve upon their previous failing seasons. However, upon Week 15 and a rating of 77.1 (25th overall in the league), Shanahan would bench McNabb in favor of their second-string Rex Grossman (who was the quarterback for the 2006 Chicago Bears that went to play in the Super Bowl).

Players

Movement
The Redskins released RBs Rock Cartwright and Ladell Betts, WR Antwaan Randle El, OG Randy Thomas, DT Cornelius Griffin and CB Fred Smoot on March 4, 2010, one day before the start of free agency.

On April 4, the Redskins traded a 2010 2nd round pick and either a 3rd or 4th round pick in 2011 for veteran Eagles QB Donovan McNabb. The conditional 3rd/4th round pick is reflective on McNabb's performance during the season.

On April 24, the Redskins traded QB Jason Campbell to the Oakland Raiders for a 2012 4th round pick. The Jason Campbell trade had been anticipated ever since the Donovan McNabb trade a few weeks before.

On June 19, the Redskins addressed their need for a strong offensive line by trading a third or fourth in 2011 (reflective on the Donovan McNabb trade) to the New Orleans Saints for Pro Bowl OT Jammal Brown.

Free agents in 2010
RFA: Restricted free-agent, UFA: Unrestricted free-agent, ERFA: Exclusive rights free agent

2010 NFL draft

The Redskins finished the 2009 season with a record of 4–12 and will be picking 4th overall.

Transactions involving 2010 draft picks
 The Redskins traded their second round pick and a third or fourth round pick in 2011 to the Eagles for quarterback Donovan McNabb.
 The Redskins forfeited their third round pick for selecting defensive end Jeremy Jarmon in the 2009 Supplemental Draft.
 The Redskins traded their sixth round pick along with a second round pick in 2009 to the Dolphins for defensive end Jason Taylor

Personnel

Final roster

Schedule

Preseason
The Redskins preseason schedule was announced on March 31, 2010.

Regular season

Standings

Preseason results
Preseason Week 1 – vs Buffalo Bills

Preseason Week 2 – vs Baltimore Ravens

Preseason Week 3 – vs New York Jets

Preseason Week 4 – vs Arizona Cardinals

Regular season results

Week 1: vs. Dallas Cowboys

The Redskins began their season at home on Sunday night against their NFC East rival, the Dallas Cowboys.  In the first quarter, Washington delivered the opening punch as kicker Graham Gano got a 29-yard field goal.  The Redskins would then close out the second quarter with cornerback DeAngelo Hall returning a fumble 25 yards for a touchdown.

The Cowboys would get on the board in the third quarter as quarterback Tony Romo found wide receiver Miles Austin on a 4-yard touchdown pass.  Washington would respond in the fourth quarter as Gano nailed a 49-yard field goal.  Afterwards, Dallas appeared to have won the game as Romo completed a 13-yard touchdown pass to wide receiver Roy Williams, but a holding call on offensive tackle Alex Barron preserved the Redskins victory.

With the win, Washington began its season at 1–0.

Week 2: vs. Houston Texans

Coming off their win over the Cowboys the Redskins played on home ground for an interconference duel with the Texans. In the 1st quarter the Redskins scored first as kicker Graham Gano got a 41 and a 27-yard field goal. In the second quarter the Redskins fell behind with QB Matt Schaub completing a 5-yard TD pass to WR Jacoby Jones, but got the lead back when RB Clinton Portis got two 1-yard TD runs to put the Redskins up 20–7. The Texans tried to cut the lead in the third quarter as kicker Neil Rackers nailed a 47-yard field goal, but the Redskins increased their lead with QB Donovan McNabb completing a 22-yard TD pass to TE Chris Cooley. The Texans went on a scoring rally to tie the game when QB Matt Schaub made a 6-yard TD pass to WR Kevin Walter, followed in the 4th quarter by Rackers making a 43-yard field goal. Then Schaub threw a 34-yard TD pass to WR Andre Johnson. The decision was made when Rackers booted a 35-yard field goal in overtime to give the Redskins a loss.

With the loss, the Redskins fell to 1–1.

Week 3: at St. Louis Rams

Coming off their heartbreaking overtime loss at home against the Texans, the Redskins traveled to Edward Jones Dome to take on the St. Louis Rams. In the first quarter, the Rams scored first with a 42-yard TD run from Steven Jackson for a 7–0 lead. following their next possession the Rams scored again with Sam Bradford connecting with Daniel Fells for a 3-yard TD Pass to go up 14–0. In the second quarter the Redskins were able to get on the board with Graham Gano kicking a 29-yard field goal, followed by them scoring a TD with Donovan McNabb connecting with Santana Moss for a 21-yard TD pass. While Gano was able to kick a 24-yard field goal to make it 14–13 at the half, in the third quarter the Redskins were only able to score with Gano kicking a 21-yard FG while Kenneth Darby responded with a 12-yard TD run. In the 4th quarter Josh Brown kicked a 37, 29 & 41-yard field goals, sealing a Redskins loss.

With the loss, Washington fell to 1–2.

Week 4: at Philadelphia Eagles

Trying to snap a two-game losing streak, the Redskins flew to Lincoln Financial Field for a Week 4 NFC East duel with the Philadelphia Eagles, as quarterback Donovan McNabb made his highly anticipated return to Philadelphia.

Washington came out strong in the first quarter as running back Ryan Torain got a 12-yard touchdown run, followed by McNabb's 31-yard touchdown pass to tight end Chris Cooley.  The Eagles answered in the second quarter as kicker David Akers made a 49-yard field goal, yet the Redskins came right back with kicker Graham Gano getting a 26-yard field goal.  Afterwards, Philadelphia closed out the half with Akers' 23-yard field goal.  After a scoreless third quarter, the Eagles tried to rally in the  fourth quarter as quarterback Kevin Kolb completed a 5-yard touchdown pass to tight end Brent Celek (with a failed two-point conversion), but Washington's defense would prevent any further progress.

With the win, the Redskins improved to 2–2.

Week 5: vs. Green Bay Packers

Coming off their win over the Eagles the Redskins played on home ground for an NFC duel with the Packers. In the first quarter the Redskins trailed early as QB Aaron Rodgers completed a 5-yard TD pass to TE Donald Lee. This was followed in the 2nd quarter by kicker Mason Crosby hitting a 52-yard field goal. The Redskins replied with kicker Graham Gano getting a 26-yard field goal. Then in the third quarter Crosby made a 36-yard field goal to put the Packers up 13–3. The Redskins rallied with QB Donovan McNabb completing a 48-yard TD pass to WR Anthony Armstrong, followed by Gano making a 45-yard-field goal. At overtime, the decision was made when Gano successfully put away a 33-yard field goal to win the game for the Redskins.

With the win, Washington improved to 3–2.

Week 6: vs. Indianapolis Colts

Coming off their thrilling overtime win over the Packers, the Redskins stayed at home for a Week 6 interconference duel with the Indianapolis Colts on Sunday night.  Washington trailed early in the first quarter as Colts quarterback Peyton Manning completed a 57-yard touchdown pass to wide receiver Pierre Garçon.  The Redskins answered with a 9-yard touchdown run from running back Ryan Torain.  Indianapolis struck back in the second quarter as Manning threw a 5-yard touchdown pass to wide receiver Austin Collie, followed by kicker Adam Vinatieri's 43-yard field goal.

Washington began to claw back into the game in the third quarter as Torain got a 1-yard touchdown run, but the Colts continued to flex their offensive muscle as running back Joseph Addai got a 13-yard touchdown run.  The Redskins continued to stay close as kicker Graham Gano booting a 39-yard field goal.  In the fourth quarter, Indianapolis continued to add onto their lead as Vinatieri made a 33-yard field goal.  Washington tried to rally as quarterback Donovan McNabb hooked up with running back Keiland Williams on an 8-yard touchdown pass, but the Colts' defense would prevent any further progress.

With the loss, the Redskins fell to 3–3.

Week 7: at Chicago Bears

The Redskins' seventh game was an NFC duel with the Bears at Soldier Field. In the first quarter, the Redskins had problems as CB D.J. Moore returned an interception 54 yards for a touchdown. However, their offense got through after QB Donovan McNabb completed a 24-yard TD pass to WR Santana Moss. In the second quarter, they took the lead after kicker Graham Gano nailed a 46-yard field goal. The lead didn't last long after QB Jay Cutler got a 9-yard TD pass to WR Johnny Knox, but they did get the lead back in the third quarter as Cutler's pass was intercepted by DeAngelo Hall and returned 92 yards for a touchdown. Hall would have a total of 4 interceptions in this game, tying a team record.

With the win, the Redskins improve to 4–3.

Week 8: at Detroit Lions

Coming off their win over the Bears the Redskins flew to Ford Field for an NFC duel with the Lions. In the 2nd quarter the Redskins trailed early as QB Matthew Stafford got a 13-yard TD pass to WR Calvin Johnson. They pulled ahead with QB Donovan McNabb getting a 6-yard TD pass to RB Ryan Torain, followed by kicker Graham Gano making a 38 and a 46-yard field goal. The Redskins trailed slightly with Stafford getting a 2-yard TD pass to TE Brandon Pettigrew. The Redskins got the lead back with RB Keiland Williams getting a 5-yard TD run (With a failed 2-point conversion). The Lions replied with Stafford finding Johnson again on a 7-yard TD pass (With a failed 2-point conversion). After that, the Redskins took the lead again with WR Brandon Banks returning a kickoff 96 yards for a touchdown (With a failed 2-point conversion) to put the Redskins up 25–20. They soon fell behind with Stafford throwing a 10-yard TD pass to Johnson (With a successful 2-point conversion as Stafford passed to WR Bryant Johnson). This was followed by kicker Jason Hanson making a 32-yard field goal, and with DT Ndamukong Suh returning a fumble 17 yards to the endzone for a touchdown (With a failed 2-point conversion).

With the loss, the Redskins went into their bye week at 4–4.

Week 10: vs. Philadelphia Eagles

Coming off their bye week, the Redskins went home for their Week 10 NFC East rematch against the Philadelphia Eagles on Monday night.  Washington immediately trailed in the first quarter as on the very first play from scrimmage, Eagles quarterback Michael Vick completed an 88-yard touchdown pass to wide receiver DeSean Jackson.  Later, Philadelphia added onto their lead with Vick getting a 7-yard touchdown run, followed by Vick completing an 11-yard touchdown pass to running back LeSean McCoy and running back Jerome Harrison getting a 50-yard touchdown run.  The Eagles would continue their dominating performance as Vick completed a 48-yard touchdown pass to wide receiver Jeremy Maclin.  The Redskins would finally get on the board with quarterback Donovan McNabb finding linebacker Darrel Young on a 3-yard touchdown pass, followed a 3-yard touchdown pass to rookie running back Keiland Williams.  Philadelphia responded with Vick getting a 6-yard touchdown run, followed by kicker David Akers getting a 48-yard field goal.

Washington began the third quarter with Williams' 4-yard touchdown run, but the Eagles continued to dictate the game as Vick completed a 3-yard touchdown pass to wide receiver Jason Avant, followed by cornerback Dimitri Patterson returning an interception 40 yards for a touchdown.  The Redskins tried to rally in the fourth quarter with Williams' 32-yard touchdown run, but Philadelphia's defense (combined with the 31-point deficit) was too much to overcome.

With the loss, Washington fell to 4–5.

Week 11: at Tennessee Titans

Hoping to rebound from their loss to the Eagles the Redskins flew to LP Field for an inter-conference duel with the Titans. In the first quarter the Redskins had problems with a three-and-out followed by a punt being returned 87 yards for a touchdown by WR Marc Mariani. They replied with QB Donovan McNabb completing a 5-yard TD pass to WR Santana Moss, followed in the second quarter by kicker Graham Gano nailing a 19-yard field goal. They lost the lead after kicker Rob Bironas made a 25 and a 32-yard field goal. However, they replied with Gano hitting a 40-yard field goal. The Titans scored with Bironas nailing a 40-yard field goal, but the Redskins replied with Gano making a 42-yard field goal. The decision was made at Overtime after Gano successfully hit a 48-yard field goal to give the Redskins the win, settling the records for both teams at 5–5.

Week 12: vs. Minnesota Vikings

Coming off their win over the Titans the Redskins played on home ground for an NFC duel with the Vikings. In the 1st quarter the Redskins took the lead as QB Donovan McNabb completed a 10-yard TD pass to TE Fred Davis. The Vikings replied as RB Adrian Peterson got a 5-yard TD run. The Redskins trailed in the third quarter with RB Toby Gerhart getting a 5-yard TD run, followed by kicker Ryan Longwell nailing a 31-yard field goal. The Redskins tried to come back, but only came away with a 40 and a 42-yard field goal from kicker Graham Gano, giving them a loss.

With the loss, the Redskins fell to 5–6.

Week 13: at New York Giants

Hoping to rebound from their loss to the Vikings the Redskins flew to New Meadowlands Stadium for an NFC East rivalry match against the Giants. In the first quarter the Redskins trailed early as RB Brandon Jacobs got an 8-yard TD run, followed by Ahmad Bradshaw getting a 4 and a 10-yard TD run. Then Jacobs got a 28-yard TD run to put the Giants up 28–0. They responded with QB Donovan McNabb completing a 33-yard TD pass to WR Anthony Armstrong, but they struggled further as kicker Lawrence Tynes made a 28-yard field goal.

With the loss, the Redskins fell to 5–7.

Week 14: vs. Tampa Bay Buccaneers

Hoping to break a two-game losing streak the Redskins played on home ground for an NFC duel with the Buccaneers. In the second quarter the Redskins took the lead as QB Donovan McNabb completed a 1-yard TD pass to TE Logan Paulsen. The Buccaneers replied as kicker Connor Barth nailed a 25-yard field goal, but the Redskins scored again with kicker Graham Gano making a 25-yard field goal. They fell behind with Barth making a 44 and a 35-yard field goal, followed by QB Josh Freeman completing a 41-yard TD pass to TE Kellen Winslow (With a successful 2-point conversion as Freeman ran to the endzone). The Redskins tried to cut the lead with McNabb throwing a 6-yard TD pass to WR Santana Moss, but the snap on the PAT fell through the hands of Hunter Smith in the final seconds, sealing the Redskins' fate in yet another backbreaking loss.

With the loss, not only did the Redskins guarantee that they would finish with more road wins than home wins for the first time since the 1994 season, but more importantly, they fell to 5–8, and were officially eliminated from postseason contention, with the Eagles' 30–27 win over the Cowboys.

Week 15: at Dallas Cowboys

The Redskins' fourteenth game was an NFC East rivalry rematch against the Cowboys at Cowboys Stadium. In the first quarter the Redskins trailed early with kicker David Buehler hitting a 42-yard field goal, followed by QB Jon Kitna throwing a 3-yard TD pass to WR Miles Austin; then Buehler made a 20-yard field goal to put Dallas up 13–0. The lead was narrowed when QB Rex Grossman completed a 19-yard TD pass to RB Ryan Torain, but fell further behind with Kitna making a 14-yard TD pass to TE Jason Witten, followed by RB Tashard Choice getting a 3-yard TD run. The Redskins replied with Grossman getting a 10-yard TD pass to WR Santana Moss, but the Cowboys scored again when Buehler got a 20-yard field goal. Washington managed to tie the game with Grossman finding Moss and Cooley on a 5-yard TD pass (With two successful 2-point conversions as Grossman passed to Cooley and Sellers). The Redskins couldn't get any further after Buehler made a 39-yard field goal, settling both records at 5–9.

Week 16: at Jacksonville Jaguars

The Redskins' fifteenth game was an interconference duel with the Jaguars. In the first quarter the Redskins took the lead as kicker Graham Gano hit a 48-yard field goal, followed by QB Rex Grossman throwing a 1-yard TD pass to TE Fred Davis. The Jaguars tied the game with QB David Garrard getting a 19-yard TD pass to Mike Thomas, followed by kicker Josh Scobee nailing a 34-yard field goal. the Redskins got the lead back in the fourth quarter with RB Ryan Torain getting a 1-yard TD run, but the Jaguars replied with Garrard scrambling 20 yards for a touchdown. The decision was made in overtime when Gano successfully hit a 31-yard field goal to give Washington the win, bringing their record up to 6–9.

Week 17: vs. New York Giants

The Redskins entered Week 17 as a spoiler in the New York Giants' run for the playoffs. In a game full of turnovers, New York gained the early upper hand with a 20-yard field goal from Lawrence Tynes. In the second quarter, the Giants added 7 more points to their score after a 2-yard run from Brandon Jacobs. Washington would put their first points on the board with a 1-yard pass from Rex Grossman to Fred Davis to conclude the scoring for the first half. The Giants went up by another seven points upon Mario Manningham's 92-yard reception from Eli Manning. The Redskins would answer with a 64-yard pass from Grossman to Anthony Armstrong, leaving the differential of the score to a field goal. In Washington's final possession, Grossman would lead the team to a turn over on downs; with no timeouts, the New York Giants would win the game (although due to Green Bay's superior head-to-head tiebreaker advantage, unable to qualify for the playoffs) and the Redskins would end their season by falling to 6–10 but surpassing their previous season's record of 4–12.

Statistics

Passing

Rushing

Receiving

Kicking

Punting

Defense

References

External links
 Official Website

Washington
Washington Redskins seasons
Red